This is an incomplete list of officers of the Indian Medical Service (IMS) before independence.

A to B

C

D to G

H to L

M to S

T to W

References

External links
Roll of the Indian Medical Services, 1614-1930 by Lt.-Col D. G. Crawford

 
Indian Medical Service
Medicine in the British Empire